Swarna Bharathi Indoor Stadium is located at Visakhapatnam, India. It is used as a multipurpose venue.

References

Sports venues in Visakhapatnam
Year of establishment missing